Harry's Heroes is an English documentary television programme produced by Fremantle for ITV. The first series Harry's Heroes: The Full English aired in March 2019. Series 2, entitled Harry's Heroes: Euro Having a Laugh aired in May 2020.

It featured former football manager Harry Redknapp attempting get a squad of former England international footballers back fit and healthy for one last game, vs a Germany Legends team. Redknapp was joined by an injured John Barnes, who acted as his assistant manager, and by sports scientist Luke Worthington, who analysed the players' weights and fitness throughout the course of filming the show.

Episodes

Series Overview
</onlyinclude>

Series 1

Episode 1
Episode 1 aired on 18 March 2019. Harry Redknapp meets up with his squad of players, who aren't expecting what is to come. The squad got weighed and had their bodies analysed, before they played their first game against Ridgeway Rovers Youth Football Club, losing 2-1, with the game ending early to prevent injuries. Whilst the majority of players begin working to become fitter and slimmer, Neil Ruddock goes on a cruise holiday. David Seaman takes Robbie Fowler and Paul Merson fishing, where Merson reveals his struggles with drugs, alcohol and gambling. Back on the training field, the squad are put through a bleep test. Mark Wright and Ray Parlour meet a golf course, before luring John Barnes into joining the squad's dieting regime, despite not being able to play. The squad meet up again, first in a gym for some strength and endurance training, and later in a recording studio to re-record World in Motion. They played their second game vs Crystal Palace Ladies, winning 1-0.

Episode 2
Episode 2 aired on 19 March 2019. The majority of the squad jetted off to Spain for a training camp, in which Robbie Fowler missed a training session due to a hangover. Meanwhile in England, Paul Merson revealed he had fallen back into a gambling addiction, and met up with Drewe Broughton, a former footballer who had suffered with addictions himself. The squad regather in England, where Merson again speaks with Seaman and Fowler about his struggles, before a number of the squad go for a session of cryotherapy, a new science used by today's modern footballers. Neil Ruddock meets up with former footballer and heart attack survivor David Ginola to talk about his health, before going for a personal check-up with a doctor, where he learns he is at a high risk of heart problems. The full squad regather to be suited up and weighed for the last time ahead of their third game, vs a Germany Legends team. Pre-match, the team were shown well-wishing videos sent in by Peter Shilton and Paul Gascoigne wishing them well, before winning the game itself 4-2.

Series 2

Cast

The Full English (Season 1)

England Team
 
 Players' ages are as of the opening episode of Season 1 (18 March 2019).

Coaching Staff

 Coaches' ages are as of the opening episode of Season 1 (18 March 2019).

Euro Having a Laugh (Season 2)

England Team

 Players' ages are as of the opening episode of Season 2 (29 April 2020).

 Vinnie Jones caps, goals and time spent in national team denotes to his appearances for Wales and not England. Jones was born in England but represented Wales at International level, despite this he appeared as a guest for the England legends in Season Two.
 Jamie Thompson is not a footballer, and was the teams physiotherapist who was forced to play due to injuries to some of the players.

Coaching Staff

 Coaches' ages are as of the opening episode of Season 2 (29 April 2020).
 Ruddock participated in the first two episodes but did not play owing to a heart condition. Jamie Thompson, the team's physio, played in the match against San Marino.

Games

Series One (2019)

The two episodes showed highlights of three games played by Harry's Heroes, winning two and losing one.

Series Two (2020)

Reception
The show received generally positive reaction, with many praising the air time given towards players talking about their mental and physical health, notably Paul Merson.

The Daily Telegraph published a 3/5 star review, calling the issues touched on by the programme "rather heartwarming."

References

Notes

2019 British television series debuts
2020 British television series endings
2010s British sports television series
2020s British sports television series
English-language television shows
Football mass media in the United Kingdom
ITV Sport
ITV (TV network) original programming
Television series by Fremantle (company)